Mannheim Road, also known as La Grange Road from Cermak Road to U.S. Route 30 (US 30; Lincoln Highway), is a north–south major street in the near-western suburbs of Chicago. It carries US 12 from Des Plaines to 95th St near Hickory Hills, US 45 between Des Plaines on southwards past Frankfort, Illinois and carries US 20 between Lake Street in Stone Park, Illinois and 95th St. near Hickory Hills.

The road is named after a former town called Mannheim that was founded by German farmers in what is now Franklin Park. From Cermak Road on the Westchester–La Grange Park border and points to the south, it is known as La Grange Road. On some small intersections on the part named La Grange Road, the street signs still call the road Mannheim or Manheim.

Mannheim Road skirts the eastern edge of O'Hare International Airport; numerous airport hotels and rental car services are located on the street near the airport. One major landmark of Mannheim Road is the Allstate Arena at the intersection of Mannheim Road and Lunt Avenue in Rosemont.

There is also a Metra station on the Milwaukee West Line at Mannheim Road; in addition, Metra's BNSF Railway Line has a stop on La Grange Road in La Grange. Also, there is an overpass that carries Mannheim Rd over Union Pacific's Proviso rail yard. There is another overpass that carries the street over Canadian Pacific's Bensenville railroad yard. At the descent of that overpass the road goes under the Tri-State Tollway.

There's also a school district on the left side of the street named Mannheim School District 83 on the intersection of Grand Avenue and Mannheim Road itself in Franklin Park. North Avenue also dips under Mannheim Road in Melrose Park.

References

Streets in Illinois
U.S. Route 12
U.S. Route 20
U.S. Route 45